Sokratis Lagoudakis (born 1861 in Crete; died 3 June 1944 in Alexandria, Kingdom of Egypt) was a Greek physician, scholar, and long-distance runner who competed at the 1896 Summer Olympics in Athens. Lagoudakis was one of 17 athletes to start the marathon race. He finished last of the nine athletes to have completed the race.

References

External links

1861 births
1944 deaths
Athletes (track and field) at the 1896 Summer Olympics
19th-century sportsmen
Greek male long-distance runners
Olympic athletes of Greece
Greek male marathon runners
Sportspeople from Crete
Date of birth missing
19th-century Greek people